Alistipes timonensis is a Gram-negative and anaerobic bacterium from the genus of Alistipes which has been isolated from human faeces.

References

Bacteria described in 2014
Bacteroidia